Barbadian culture